Willie Littlefield, Jr., billed as Little Willie Littlefield (September 16, 1931 – June 23, 2013), was an American R&B and boogie-woogie pianist and singer whose early recordings "formed a vital link between boogie-woogie and rock and roll". Littlefield was regarded as a teenage wonder and overnight sensation when in 1949, at the age of 18, he popularized the triplet piano style on his Modern Records debut single, "It's Midnight". He also recorded the first version of the song "Kansas City" (originally issued as "K. C. Lovin'"), in 1952.

Career

Early career
Littlefield was born in El Campo, Texas, and grew up in Houston with his mother. By 1947, at the age of sixteen, he was already a local attraction in many of the clubs on Dowling Street in Houston and was recording for Eddie Henry, a local record shop proprietor who ran his own label, Eddie's Records. He formed his first band with the saxophonist Don Wilkerson, a friend from school.

Littlefield was strongly influenced by the boogie-woogie pianist Albert Ammons. A particular favourite of his was Ammons's "Swanee River Boogie", which he later recorded for Eddie's Records. Other major influences on Littlefield's style were the Texas musicians Charles Brown and Amos Milburn. Littlefield learned most of their "chops" and soon developed his own distinctive triplet style, which was widely copied by R&B musicians in the early 1950s, particularly Fats Domino, who incorporated it into his New Orleans rhythm and blues.

His first recording, "Little Willie's Boogie", was a hit in Texas in 1949 and brought him to the attention of Jules Bihari, of Modern Records in Los Angeles, who was searching for a performer to rival the success of Amos Milburn. Bihari flew to Houston in July 1949 to investigate the city's black entertainment venues and heard of a "teenage wonder boy pianist" who was causing a stir at the Eldorado Ballroom. Bihari went to hear Littlefield and soon arranged for an audition at a local studio. The session was captured on acetate disc, with Bihari, clearly audible in the background, calling for Littlefield to play popular R&B tunes of the day.

Success at Modern records
Back at Modern Records, he recorded "It's Midnight", which became a national hit, reaching number three on the Billboard R&B chart, and its follow-up, "Farewell", which reached number five. He became a major nightclub attraction and recorded with West Coast musicians such as Maxwell Davis. Don Wilkerson, Littlefield's schoolmate and the leading saxophone player in his band, also travelled to Los Angeles, but Milburn promptly persuaded him to lead Milburn's new band, the Aladdin Chickenshackers.

Modern Records booked Littlefield for three recording sessions in October 1949, followed by more sessions over the next two months at Radio Recorders in Hollywood. During these three months alone, over 22 sides were cut – an unusual output compared to that of most other artists, who averaged only two sessions a year. Other musicians at these sessions included the saxophonists Maxwell Davis and Buddy Floyd, the guitarists Chuck Norris and Johnny Moore, and the drummers Al Wichard and Jessie Price. One of his 1950 recordings, "Happy Pay Day", written by Jack Holmes, was later rewritten by Holmes with entirely different lyrics as "The Blacksmith Blues", which became a hit for Ella Mae Morse.

In 1951, his duet with Little Lora Wiggins, "I've Been Lost", reached number 10 on the R&B chart.

In 1952 he moved to the Federal subsidiary of King Records. His first session for Federal produced "K. C. Loving", written by Jerry Leiber and Mike Stoller and later re-recorded by Wilbert Harrison as "Kansas City".

By 1957 Littlefield had moved to northern California and continued to record for Don Barksdale's Rhythm label in San Francisco, for which he produced the single "Ruby, Ruby". Littlefield's recording and his subsequent releases were not successful, but he remained a popular performer in clubs in the San Francisco area.

In the late 1970s he toured Europe successfully, settling in the Netherlands and releasing a number of albums from 1982 into the late 1990s for the Oldie Blues label from Martin van Olderen.

Retirement and comeback

After touring for more than 50 years, Littlefield stopped in 2000. After five years of retirement in his adopted home country, the Netherlands, he decided to play again, starting in 2006, declaring, "I went fishing for five years – now I know every herring in Holland by name – it got boring. I feel great and I want to be back with my audience."

In his later years Littlefield continued to perform occasionally, mainly at festivals, particularly in the UK. In 2008 he played at the 20th Burnley Blues Festival, in 2008, and at the 5th annual UK Boogie Woogie Festival at Sturminster Newton in Dorset, in July 2009. He performed at Shakedown Blues Club, at Castor Village Hall, near Castor, Peterborough, in 2006 and made a return appearance in October 2010.

He died at his home in Voorthuizen, Netherlands, in 2013, at the age of 81. He had cancer.

Selected discography

Selected singles
 1948 (late): "Little Willie's Boogie" / "My Best Wishes", Eddie's 1202 (10" shellac)
 1948 (late): "Medley Boogie", Eddie's (unreleased)
 1949 (early): "What's the Use" / "Chicago Bound", Eddie's 1205 (10" shellac)
 c. 3/49: "Littlefield Boogie" (flip side, "Sweet Ole Woman's Blues" by Goree Carter), Freedom 1502 (10" shellac)
 1949: "Boogie Woogie Playgirl" / "Swanee River" (piano solo), Eddie's 1212 (10" shellac)
 1949: "Midnight Whistle" / "It's Midnight", Modern 20-686 (10" shellac)
 1949: "Drinkin' Hadacol" / "Farewell", Modern 20-709 (10" shellac)
 c. 12/49: "Come On Baby" / "Merry Christmas", Modern 20-716 (10" shellac)
 1950: "The Moon Is Risin'" / "Frightened", Modern 20-726 (10" shellac)
 3/50: "Your Love Wasn't So" / "Rocking Chair Mama", Modern 20-729 (10" shellac)
 1950: "Tell Me Baby" / "Why Leave Me All Alone", Modern 20-747 (10" shellac)
 1950: "Cheerful Baby" / "Happy Pay Day", Modern 20-754 (10" shellac)
 10/50: "Trouble Around Me" / "Hit the Road", Modern 20-775 (shellac, 10")
 c. 11/50: "Ain't a Better Story Told" / "You Never Miss a Good Woman Till She's Gone", Modern 20-781 (10" shellac)
 c. 12/50: "Come On Baby" / "Merry Christmas", Modern 20-785 (10" shellac)
 1951: "Once Was Lucky" / "I've Been Lost", Modern 20-801 (10" shellac)
 1951: "Lump in My Throat" / "Mean, Mean Woman", Modern 837 (10" shellac)
 1951: "Life of Trouble" / "Too Late for Me", Modern 854 (shellac, 10")
 1952: "Sticking on You Baby" / "Blood Is Redder Than Wine", Federal 12101 (10" shellac, 7" vinyl)
 c. 11/52: "K. C. Loving" / "Pleading at Midnight", Federal 12110 (10" shellac, vinyl, 7")
 3/53 : "Turn the Lamps Down Low", duet with Little Esther [Phillips] (flip side by Little Esther), Federal 12115 (10" shellac, vinyl, 7")
 1953: "The Midnight Hour Was Shining" / "My Best Wishes and Regards", Federal 12137 (10" shellac, 7" vinyl)
 1953: "Rock a Bye Baby" / "Miss K. C.'s Fine", Federal 12148 (10" shellac, 7" vinyl)
 1/54: "Please Don't Go-o-o-o-oh" / "Don't Take My Heart Little Girl", Federal 12163 (10" shellac, 7" vinyl)
 1954: "Falling Tears" / "Goofy Dust Blues" Federal 12174 (10" shellac, 7" vinyl)
 1955: "Jim Wilson's Boogie" / "Sitting on the Curbstone", Federal 12221 (10" shellac, 7" vinyl)
 8/57: "Mistreated" / "Baby Shame", Rhythm 107 (10" shellac, 7" vinyl)
 12/57: "Ruby-Ruby", with the Mondellos (vocal group) / "Easy Go" (instrumental), Rhythm 108 (7" vinyl)
 1958: "Theresa", with female vocal group / "The Day the Rains Came" (instrumental), Rhythm 124 (7" vinyl)
 1958: "Ruby-Ruby", with the Mondellos (vocal group) / "Easy Go" (instrumental), Bullseye 1005 (shellac, 10", 7" vinyl)
 1958: "I Need a Payday" / "I Want a Little Girl", Rhythm 115 (7" vinyl)
 c. 4/59: "Kansas City" ["K. C. Loving"] / "The Midnight Hour Was Shining", Federal 12351 (7" vinyl)
 1959: "Goodbye Baby" / "I Wanna Love You", Rhythm 130 (7" vinyl)
 1960: "Ruby-Ruby", with the Mondellos (vocal group) / "Easy Go"  (instrumental), Argyle 1013 (7" vinyl)
 1975: "Mac's Old House" / "San Jose Express", Blues Connoisseur 1008 (7" vinyl)
 1976: "Willie's Blues" / "I'll Tell the World I Do", Blues Connoisseur 1011 (7" vinyl)

Albums
 1980: Paris Streetlights, Paris Album PLB 2 28508 (recorded May 14, 1980); reissued on CD, 1996, EPM Blues Collection BC 157802
 1982: Houseparty, Oldie Blues OL 8003 (recorded June 1982)
 1983: I'm in the Mood, Oldie Blues OL 8006 (recorded 1983)
 1985: Happy Pay Day, Ace CH 150
 1987: Plays the Boogie Woogie, Schubert Records SCH-100 (recorded 1987); reissued on CD, 1992, Munich CMA CM 8013 
 1990: Singalong with Little Willie Littlefield, Oldie Blues OLCD 7001 (recorded 1987)
 1992: ... Goes Rhythm 'n Blues, CMA Music CMA CM 10002
 1993: The Stars of Rhythm 'n Blues! CMA Music CMA CM 10007
 1994: Yellow Boogie & Blues, Oldie Blues OLCD 7006 (recorded 1994)
 1997: The Red One, Oldie Blues OLCD 7005 (recorded June 1997)
 2006: Little Willie Littlefield Live, Schubert Records SCH-205 (recorded live in Germany, April 20, 2006)
 2008: Old Time Feeling, Stormy Monday 81242

Selected compilation albums
 1977: K. C. Loving, K.C. 101 (LP)
 1980: Volume 1, Ace 10 CH 24 (10" 8-track album)
 1981: Volume 2, Ace 10 CH 34 (10" 8-track album)
 1984: Jump with Little Willie Littlefield, Ace CHD 114
 1993: I'm in the Mood, Oldie Blues OLCD 7002 (recorded 1982, 1983)
 1995: Going Back to Kay Cee, Ace CDCHD 503
 1999: Kat on the Keys, Ace CDCHD 736
 2005: Boogie, Blues and Bounce: The Modern Recordings Volume 2, Ace CDCHD 1056

See also

 Chicago Blues Festival
 List of blues musicians
 List of boogie woogie musicians
 List of jump blues musicians
 List of West Coast blues musicians
 San Francisco Blues Festival
 West Coast blues

References

External links
[ Biography] at Allmusic
Little Willie Littlefield discography compiled by Pete Hoppula
Little Willie Littlefield discography at Discogs
Little Willie Littlefield discography at Rate Your Music
 

 

1931 births
2013 deaths
African-American pianists
American blues pianists
American male pianists
American rhythm and blues musicians
Boogie-woogie pianists
Jump blues musicians
People from El Campo, Texas
Modern Records artists
Federal Records artists
Ace Records (United Kingdom) artists
Oldie Blues artists
West Coast blues musicians
20th-century American pianists
20th-century American male musicians
20th-century African-American musicians
21st-century African-American people